Max Pitt (born  4 January 1946)  is a former Australian rules footballer who played with  Collingwood and St Kilda in the Victorian Football League from 1966 until 1969, playing 34 games and kicking 8 goals.

External links

1946 births
Australian rules footballers from Victoria (Australia)
Collingwood Football Club players
St Kilda Football Club players
Living people